National Democratic Alternative may refer to:

 National Democratic Alternative (Portugal)
 National Democratic Alternative (Serbia)